Akeel Seetal (born 3 July 1997) is a West Indian cricketer. He played his only List A cricket match for West Indies under-19 cricket team in the Nagico Super50 2014–2015 on 18 January 2015.

References

External links
 

1997 births
Living people